Nguyễn Thiên Nga (born 1975 in Saigon) was crowned the fifth Miss Vietnam in 1996. At the time of the contest she was a second year student at the Foreign Trade University in Ho Chi Minh City. She also won the best answer award in the competition.
Nguyễn Thiên Nga is the first contestant in the history of the competition to win two "Miss Vietnam" titles, the first in 1996 as the official contestant and the second title in 1999. In that year she was the special contestant for choosing a delegate representative for Vietnam in the "Miss Friendship of the World 1999" competition. After graduating from the Foreign Trade University in 2000, Nguyễn Thiên Nga decided to study economics in the United States.

Miss Viet Nam 1996 
 Winner : Nguyễn Thiên Nga (Saigon)
 First runner-up : Vũ Minh Thuý (Hải Phòng)
 Second runner-up : Đỗ Vân Anh (Hà Nội)

External links
 Miss Vietnam

1976 births
Living people
Miss Vietnam winners
People from Ho Chi Minh City